Rashid Shabazz, known professionally by the nickname “Roc”, is an American IFBB Pro Champion, celebrity fitness trainer, and business owner.

Best known for his accomplishments in the bodybuilding industry, Roc spent many years under the mentorship of eight-time Mr.Olympia, Lee Haney. He took home 1st place in the 2010 Phoenix Pro in Arizona, and 2nd in the Orlando Europa Pro that same year

Early life & education 
The oldest of three boys raised by their mother, Rashid’s formative years were spent in Bay St. Louis, Mississippi. Upon graduating from Bay High School, where he was a letterman in football, baseball, and tennis, Roc attended Jackson State University on a baseball scholarship to further his education. 

He graduated from JSU in 1990 with a Bachelor's degree in Business, and was the first in his family to graduate from a 4-year institution. During his college years was also when Roc first found notoriety, having set an, at the time, all-time state record for a 318lb bench-press – when weighing in at only 132lbs (and 5’5) himself.

Bodybuilding & IFBB career 
In 1991, Roc moved to Atlanta to study under the tutelage of Lee Haney, who he credits with much of his success. Under his guidance, Roc spent the next six years learning and living the intricacies of competitive bodybuilding. During this time was also when Roc met his longtime training partner Jonathan Rowe. In 1999, he chose to compete in his first local qualifying show, the Eastern Seaboard Bodybuilding Championship, where he took home the titles for Middleweight and Overall Champion. 

Desiring to compete at a higher level and earn IFBB Pro Status, Roc participated and placed in multiple National Physique Committee Nationals shows in the Light-Heavyweight Division between 2001 and 2003. He earned his IFBB Pro status in 2004, when he took home the Championship title for the light-heavyweights at the NPC Nationals in Dallas, Texas. 

After obtaining Pro Status, Shabazz would go on to compete and place in numerous professional shows between 2006 and 2008, including: the Australian Pro Grand Prix, the San Francisco Grand Prix, the IronMan Pro in Pasadena, the New York Pro, the Europa Supershow in Dallas, and the Tampa Pro in Florida.

Business endeavors 
Shabazz became a business owner in 2007 after opening his first fitness facility, Fitness Pros Wellness Center/Fitness Pro2000, in Georgia. His focus was on developing and blending workout regimes with nutritional meal plans to suit the individual, and has also stated a preference for training some clients in groups for the motivational effect. He was named "Chief Fitness Officer" for Shaquille O'Neal, and has trained other professional athletes like Shannon Sharpe, Ray Lewis, and various physique competitors.

In addition to personal training, Roc has worked as a motivational speaker, IFBB special guest, promoter and host, and corporate consultant. He has also been featured in numerous publications, television shows, and radio specials, including FLEX magazine, Muscle & Fitness, Iron Man magazine, Muscular Development, ProSource, and Body Fitness.

Shabazz currently owns and operates ROC Fitness, his fitness and personal training facility in Sandy Springs, GA.

Personal life 
Roc met and married his long-time friend, Gina, in Atlanta, Georgia in 1996. Also a fitness trainer and business partner, Gina and Roc share three children together, two daughters and a son, from previous relationships

Bodybuilding titles

References 

American bodybuilders

Living people
Year of birth missing (living people)
People from Bay St. Louis, Mississippi